The Lindy effect (also known as Lindy's Law) is a theorized phenomenon by which the future life expectancy of some non-perishable things, like a technology or an idea, is proportional to their current age. Thus, the Lindy effect proposes the longer a period something has survived to exist or be used in the present, the longer its remaining life expectancy. Longevity implies a resistance to change, obsolescence or competition and greater odds of continued existence into the future. Where the Lindy effect applies, mortality rate decreases with time. Mathematically, the Lindy effect corresponds to lifetimes following a Pareto probability distribution.

The concept is named after Lindy's delicatessen in New York City, where the concept was informally theorized by comedians.  The Lindy effect has subsequently been theorized by mathematicians and statisticians. Nassim Nicholas Taleb has expressed the Lindy effect in terms of "distance from an absorbing barrier".

The Lindy effect applies to "non-perishable" items, those that do not have an "unavoidable expiration date". For example, human beings are perishable: the life expectancy at birth in developed countries is about 80 years. So the Lindy effect does not apply to individual human lifespan: it is unlikely for a 5-year-old human to die within the next 5 years, but it is very likely for a 70-year-old human to die within the next 70 years, while the Lindy effect would predict these to have equal probability.

History

The origin of the term can be traced to Albert Goldman and a 1964 article he had written in The New Republic titled "Lindy's Law". The term Lindy refers to Lindy's delicatessen in New York, where comedians "foregather every night [to] conduct post-mortems on recent show business 'action'". In this article, Goldman describes a folkloric belief among New York City media observers that the amount of material comedians have is constant, and therefore, the frequency of output predicts how long their series will last:

Benoit Mandelbrot defined a different concept with the same name in his 1982 book The Fractal Geometry of Nature. In Mandelbrot's version, comedians do not have a fixed amount of comedic material to spread over TV appearances, but rather, the more appearances they make, the more future appearances they are predicted to make: Mandelbrot expressed mathematically that for certain things bounded by the life of the producer, like human promise, future life expectancy is proportional to the past. He references Lindy's Law and a parable of the young poets' cemetery and then applies to researchers and their publications: "However long a person's past collected works, it will on the average continue for an equal additional amount. When it eventually stops, it breaks off at precisely half of its promise."

Nassim Taleb presented a version of Mandelbrot's idea in The Black Swan: The Impact of the Highly Improbable by extending it to a certain class of non-perishables where life expectancy can be expressed as power laws.

In Taleb's 2012 book Antifragile: Things That Gain from Disorder he for the first time explicitly referred to his idea as the Lindy Effect, removed the bounds of the life of the producer to include anything which doesn't have a natural upper bound, and incorporated it into his broader theory of the Antifragile.

 According to Taleb, Mandelbrot agreed with the expanded definition of the Lindy Effect: "I [Taleb] suggested the boundary perishable/nonperishable and he [Mandelbrot] agreed that the nonperishable would be power-law distributed while the perishable (the initial Lindy story) worked as a mere metaphor."

Mathematical formulation
Mathematically, the relation postulated by the Lindy effect can be expressed as the following statement about a random variable T corresponding to the lifetime of the object (e.g. a comedy show), which is assumed to take values in the range  (with a lower bound ):

Here the left hand side denotes the conditional expectation of the remaining lifetime , given that  has exceeded , and the parameter  on the right hand side (called "Lindy proportion" by Iddo Eliazar) is a positive constant.

This is equivalent to the survival function of T being

which has the hazard function

This means that the lifetime  follows a Pareto distribution (a power-law distribution) with exponent .

Conversely, however, only Pareto distributions with exponent  correspond to a lifetime distribution that satisfies Lindy's Law, since the Lindy proportion  is required to be positive and finite (in particular, the lifetime  is assumed to have a finite expectation value). Iddo Eliazar has proposed an alternative formulation of Lindy's Law involving the median instead of the mean (expected value) of the remaining lifetime , which corresponds to Pareto distributions for the lifetime  with the full range of possible Pareto exponents . Eliazar also demonstrated a relation to Zipf’s Law, and to socioeconomic inequality, arguing that "Lindy’s Law, Pareto’s Law and Zipf’s Law are in effect synonymous laws."

See also
 Doomsday argument
 Memorylessness
Ergodic theory
 Planning fallacy
 Preferential attachment
 Survivorship curve
 Survivorship bias
Weibull distribution

References

Economics effects
Ageing
Survival analysis